The Twenty-Ninth Canadian Ministry is the Cabinet, chaired by Prime Minister Justin Trudeau, that began governing Canada shortly before the opening of the 42nd Parliament. The original members were sworn in during a ceremony held at Rideau Hall on November 4, 2015. Those who were not already members of the privy council were sworn into it in the same ceremony. The Cabinet currently consists of 35 members including Trudeau, with 17 women and 18 men. When the ministry was first sworn in, with fifteen men and fifteen women (aside from Trudeau), it became the first gender-balanced cabinet in Canadian history.

Trudeau has carried out two major Cabinet reshuffles: one in 2018 and another in 2021.

On October 26, 2021, one month after the 2021 Canadian federal election that gave the governing Liberal Party a second minority mandate; the ministry underwent a cabinet shuffle, resulting in many promotions, demotions and removals from cabinet.

List of ministers

By minister

The list below follows the Canadian order of precedence, which is established by the chronological order of appointment to the King's Privy Council for Canada, then in order of election or appointment to Parliament for ministers who joined the Privy Council on the same day, with former ministers being listed last in order of appointment to the Privy Council.

By portfolio

Renamed, eliminated and new ministries

Cabinet shuffles

2018 shuffle 
On 18 July 2018, Prime Minister of Canada Justin Trudeau carried out a significant reshuffle of his ministry. This included the adding of 5 new ministry positions, expanding the previous size of cabinet from 30 to 35. The cabinet remained gender balanced.

The appointment of Bill Blair as the new Minister of Border Security and Organized Crime Reduction was praised by Opposition Immigration Critic Michelle Rempel, in response to an increase of illegal crossings of the Canada–United States border. The Deputy Leader of the Opposition Lisa Raitt called the reshuffle a "desperate attempt to hit the reset button before the next election".

The reshuffle was labeled by CBC News as Trudeau's re-election kickoff for the 2019 federal election.

2021 shuffle 

On 12 January 2021, Trudeau carried out a shuffle of his ministry. It came shortly after Innovation minister Navdeep Bains announced he intended to stand down from the government and not seek re-election at the 2021 Canadian federal election. The shuffle spurred speculation of a snap election.

See also
List of prime ministers of Canada
List of current Parliamentary Secretaries of Canada

Notes

References

Succession 

2015 establishments in Canada
29
Ministries of Elizabeth II
Ministries of Charles III
42nd Canadian Parliament
43rd Canadian Parliament
44th Canadian Parliament
Cabinets established in 2015
Justin Trudeau
Current governments